Protogobius attiti is a species of loach goby which is endemic to nine rivers in South Province, New Caledonia. It occurs in rivers with ultramafic beds. It prefers areas where there is a gravel substrate under overhanging vegetation in slower reaches of fast flowing, clear streams. The rocks and gravel in the areas in which it occurs are usually coated with detritus. When threatened it buries itself in the gravel leaving its eyes, mouth and first dorsal fin above the substrate. Its main prey is small freshwater crustaceans, especially the abundant transparent shrimp which occur in these streams. It is threatened by nickel mining which creates sediments which blanker the rocks on which it hides and destroys the algae its prey feed on. The specific name honours a Melanesian chief of Goro, New Caledonia.

References

Rhyacichthyidae
Fish described in 1998